Taras Chopyk (born 2 February 1972) is a Ukrainian football coach and former player who played as a goalkeeper.

External links
 
 

1972 births
Living people
Ukrainian footballers
Association football goalkeepers
Ukrainian expatriate footballers
Expatriate footballers in Russia
Ukrainian expatriate sportspeople in Russia
Expatriate footballers in Azerbaijan
Ukrainian expatriate sportspeople in Azerbaijan
FC Karpaty Lviv players
FC Hazovyk Komarno players
FC Volyn Lutsk players
FC Oleksandriya players
FC Anzhi Makhachkala players
FC Nyva Vinnytsia players
FC Dnipro Cherkasy players
Simurq PIK players
Ukrainian football managers
Ukrainian expatriate football managers
Expatriate football managers in Belarus
Ukrainian expatriate sportspeople in Belarus
FC Naftan Novopolotsk managers
Ukrainian Premier League managers
Sportspeople from Lviv